was Governor of the South Seas Mandate (1933–1936). He was a graduate of the University of Tokyo. He was mayor of Kawagoe, Saitama. He was from Okayama Prefecture.

1881 births
1963 deaths
Governors of the South Seas Mandate
Japanese Home Ministry government officials
Japanese Police Bureau government officials
University of Tokyo alumni
People from Okayama Prefecture
People of the Kwantung Leased Territory
Kawagoe, Saitama
Mayors of places in Saitama Prefecture